KTEW-LD, virtual and UHF digital channel 18, is a low-powered Retro TV-affiliated television station licensed to Ponca City, Oklahoma, United States. Founded July 28, 1989, the station is owned by Mable Marie Kelly. They suspend the license. On cable, the station is carried by Cable One in Ponca City on channel 20 and by Suddenlink in Blackwell on channel 8.

Digital channels
The station's digital signal is multiplexed:

References

External links

TEW-LD
Television channels and stations established in 1989
Low-power television stations in the United States
Kay County, Oklahoma